Dove Bradshaw (born September 24, 1949) is an American artist. She has created chemical paintings that change with the atmosphere, erosion sculptures of salt, and stone sculptures that weather; and worked with crystals that receive radio transmissions from weather stations, in both local and short wave, along with radio telescope signals from Jupiter.

Four mid-career exhibitions include:

 1984 Syracuse University, Utica, New York;
 1998, the Museum of Contemporary Art, Los Angeles;
 2003, City University of New York, with the publication of The Art of Dove Bradshaw, Nature, Change and Indeterminacy, text by Thomas McEvilley; and featuring a conversation with John Cage about Dove Bradshaw's work.
 2008, Time Matters catalogue, Pierre Menard Gallery, Cambridge, Massachusetts, with catalogue. Represented in the permanent collections of numerous American (Museum of Modern Art, the Metropolitan Museum of Art, the National Gallery), European (British Museum) and Russian (Russian State Museum, Marble Palace). Exhibiting regularly internationally, she was included in the Gwangju Biennale, South Korea and a solo exhibition in Tokyo.

Education and residencies

Bradshaw was born in New York City. A graduate from the College of General Studies, Boston University, Bradshaw received a BFA from the Boston Museum School of Fine Arts/Tufts University.

She has had residencies at:

Indeterminacy

Taking inspiration from the work of composer John Cage, Bradshaw allows natural forces to act upon her works. Her first work in this regard was a 1969 installation entitled Plein Air, in which a pair of mourning doves were introduced to hanging bicycle wheels and floor mounted targets.

Other ways in which her work has incorporated indeterminacy into its nature are the chance positioning of work, the use of materials particularly susceptible to weather and indoor atmosphere, the gradual erosion by water of salt and stone, and the use of inherently unstable substances such as acetone, mercury and sulfur.

One of her ongoing indeterminate works is Performance. In 1976 Bradshaw “claimed” a fire hose in the Metropolitan Museum of Art. She mounted a guerrilla wall label beside the hose, and placed copies of a self-published postcard in the museum shop. In recognition of her claim, an official museum postcard was issued of the work in 1992, and in 2006, Dadaist collector Rosalind Jacobs acquired the label placed by Bradshaw. Jacobs donated this piece to the Metropolitan Museum, who accepted the piece as part of their permanent collection in 2007.

Bradshaw's fusion of scientific exploration with art practice has been incorporated into the Process and Art/Science Movements. In this vein she made the chemically activated silver Contingency Paintings that are sensitive to atmospheric conditions. Weather serves as a catalyst slowly capturing transient metamorphoses in what she calls Time Sculptures in marble, pyrite, calcstone, and copper, in the Indeterminacy, Material/Immaterial and Notation Series. In the Negative Ions, Six Continents and Waterstones works, Bradshaw plots the gradual erosion of salt and stone with water as the transformative agent. Time is the counterpoint. She has said “Poetry is everywhere evident and therefore one only need present materials.”

Three retrospectives and public collections

An early survey, Works 1969–1984 was shown at Syracuse University, Utica, New York in 1984. Bradshaw has had three mid-career exhibitions, beginning in 1998 with Dove Bradshaw 1988–1998 at the Museum of Contemporary Art, Los Angeles; Dove Bradshaw, Form formlessness, 1969–2003 at City University of New York; and Time Matters 1969–2008 at the Pierre Menard Gallery, Cambridge, Massachusetts. She is represented in the permanent collections of numerous museums in America and Europe, including one in Russia. She also regularly exhibits internationally.

Commissions

In June 2006 Bradshaw was commissioned by Baronessa Lucrezia Durini to execute Radio Rocks as a permanent installation in Bologna. Galena and pyrite tuners continuously draw local, shortwave and outer space signals echoing the Big Bang. In May 2008, Larry Becker Contemporary Art in Philadelphia will host the first gallery installation, which will add a live reception from radio telescopes of storms and other radio emissions from the planets.

In the fall of 2006 sponsored by Shu Uemura of Shu Uemura Cosmetics, she traveled to Asia for the first time exhibiting in Tokyo's Gallery 360°.

For the 6th Gwangju Biennale in South Korea she presented Six Continents, with salt taken from each of the continents.

Important recent exhibitions

Recently she was included in the Solomon R. Guggenheim Museum's American Artists Contemplate Asia, 1860–1989, a solo exhibition at Senzatitolo Associazione Culturale, Rome, inclusion in Elements at The Chemical Heritage Museum, Philadelphia for The Year of Chemistry 2011.

Awards

 1975: National Endowment of the Arts Award for Sculpture
 1985: The Pollock-Krasner Award for Painting
 1986: Designed the costumes for the Points In Space video that won the Prague d’Or the following year
1987: The Arts Grant for Merce Cunningham Dance (Design and Lighting)
 2002: Furthermore Grant for The Art of Dove Bradshaw
 2006: National Science Foundation Artists and Writers Grant.

Curatorial work

She has curated four group exhibitions in memory of Sol LeWitt, ONE at Bjorn Ressle Gallery, New York, 2007, ONE More at the Esbjerg Art Museum, Esbjerg, Denmark, 2008 which was rebuilt for Thomas Rehbein Gallery, Cologne in January, 2009 and ONE, Six Americans/Six Danes Stalke Up North, Copenhagen, 2009. Anastasi, Bradshaw, Cage, Marioni, Rauschenberg, Tobey: Imitating Nature in her Manner of Operation, Sandra Gering Gallery, 1991; 8 Painters:
2005

Anastasi Bradshaw Cage Cunningham, curators: Marianne Bech and Dove Bradshaw, The University Art Museum, The University of California at San Diego; Anastasi Bradshaw Cage Cunningham, curators: Marianne Bech and Dove Bradshaw, The Bayly Museum, The University of Virginia, Charlottesville, Virginia; 2001; Anastasi, Bradshaw, Cage, curators: Marianna Bech and Dove Bradshaw, Museum of Contemporary Art, Roskilde, Denmark, Anastasi, Bradshaw, Cage, Marioni, Rauschenberg, Tobey, Sandra Gering Gallery, New York, 1990; 8 Painters:Jon Abbot, William Anastasi, Dove Bradshaw, Dana Gordon, Bruce Halpin, Carl Kielblock, Theodoros Stamos, Douglas Vogel, The Ericson Gallery, New York, 1981

Works

Plein Air (1969)
Originally not conceived as art, this work began with a gift of a pair of Ring-necked Mourning doves and led to the design of their environment. The doves were given free rein of the artist's studio. A bicycle wheel was hung for a perch, with an adaptation of a Zen archer's target nailed to the floor below. The material trace of the work lay in photographs and 1969 bronze and silver casts of broken eggshells.

The first exhibition was at the Boston Museum School of Fine Arts, 1969, twenty years later it opened at the Sandra Gering in New York, 1989, then at the Mattress Factory Museum, Pittsburgh, 1990, and PS1 Contemporary Art Center, New York, 1991. This was the artist's first sound sculpture—most apparent in the PS1 exhibition. Every day, after eating and preening, one of four birds flew to each corner room-support near the ceiling. Beginning with out-of-phase rounds they gradually came into sync after three-quarters of an hour, winding their song into a hypnotic crescendo nearing the hour. A pause followed, then softly they would start again, and repeated this pattern many times.

Contingency (1984)
The Contingency Series is Bradshaw's first significant body of two-dimensional work. Beginning in 1984, instead of paint she began using materials reactive to the environment.

Silver, which itself is subject to air, light and humidity, became the ground; liver of sulfur the chemical agent; and metal plates, wood, paper, linen, and the wall itself the various supports. The works range in size from a three and a half inch leaf on paper to paintings five feet in height and width. The appearance and composition of these works changes over time as reactions between the materials and environment occur.

The amount of chemicals used in each piece significantly affects the outcome. Black comes up faster if the solution is dense, yet if it pools, an ashy white appears, flaking at its edges. Fire seems to be the reference. With rain the works sweat—-drip lines become visible pouring from denser pools. Silver and sulfur, alchemical elements, are used because they are highly volatile.

As the artist explains, the process itself could be related to photography: the silver to the emulsion, the liver of sulfur to the developer. Although without using a fixer, the exposure is open-ended.

Guilty Marks (1990)
These paintings deal with themes of perishability and change. They consist of various chemicals, powdered pigments, ink, and varnish poured and dripped on the canvas. As a Danish reviewer wrote, “What the elements will do to one another only time will tell. The fusion between the materials is the essential – [like] the fusion between culture and nature. Bradshaw facilitates it, but after that, the work is out of her hands. It is nature that takes over."

Passion, Notation, Indeterminacy, Material/Immaterial: outdoor sculptures (beginning 1993)
After Bradshaw's environmentally reactive works which were the two-dimensional Contingency Series, she searched for a way to make sculptures that would be similarly reactive, but would also change shape.

The first work was a relief, a wall-embedded copper bar titled Passion. It was treated with acetic acid, which left a running stain down the wall. The first outdoor version (1995) was set in the exterior wall of the Pier Art Center, Stromness, Orkney, Scotland. The island atmosphere greatly assisted a natural bleed.

Notation (1993)
The Notation sculptures consist of copper or bronze cubes or prisms set on marble or limestone and left outdoors to weather. Smaller indoor versions were assisted with ammonium chloride copper sulfate to prompt a bleed.

Indeterminacy (1995)

The Indeterminacy Stones, begun in 1994, consisted of a chunk of pyrite, set atop a piece of marble, and then left outdoors to weather. The pyrite transformed into limonite when exposed to the elements, leaving a permanent iron rust stain. It may take less than ten years or over a century to dissolve depending on composition and environment. For the first exhibition of these works at Sandra Gering Gallery, New York, 1995, three boulders were gathered—one flat, one vertical, one wedge-shaped.

Ann Barclay Morgan, writing about work in Sculpture Magazine, commented “…the action of “bleeding”…could be seen as the female life-force in the process of being released. The transformation into the deep-colored limonite lends a sensuous quality to the marble....Bradshaw's use of Vermont marble [also] had intriguing implications. This material appears to embody a freeing from the confining notion of purity, emblematic of Carrara marble, toward the reality of life suggested by the veining of the marble itself, calling to mind the arteries of the human body that become more visible with age.”

Material/Immaterial (2000)
The Material/Immaterial Stones, made in Denmark, coupled local spring and aged calcstone and produced a white bleed on a dark stone.

Radio Rocks (1999)
Radio Rocks are made up of three different kinds of stones each piled into cairns that in Neolithic times were used as astronomical markers. Bradshaw's cairns, in addition to recalling their ancient use, focus on the aspect of sound by functioning as multi-directional antennas.

In each of these sculptures there are three radios designed to receive frequencies from three different zones. On top of one is a pyrite mixer designed to receive live emissions from Jupiter transmitted via a dedicated line from the radio telescope at Pisgah Astronomical Research Institute in Rosman, North Carolina. On one side, a galena mixer picked up a world-band short wave. On the other hand, a receiver developed by the satellite industry drew live microwaves identified as echoes of the Big Bang. The other two cairns featured fluorite, tourmaline and hematite, acting as non-linear mixers, were computer programmed to attract random local and world-band frequencies. The hematite mixer continuously channeled Weather Radio. Levels of all the radios were set at a murmur. The outer space sounds invoke celestial harmonies that from the quieter time of Pythagoras have been referred to as the “Music of the Spheres.”

Six Continents (2003)
Six Continents at the 6th Gwangju Biennale, Gwangju, South Korea, 2006 consists of six sculptures made from salt taken from each continent, funnels and water. The various salts, colored by minerals from each locale, react differently when subjected to water. Each sculpture is made of a 150-pound salt mound placed under a suspended funnel, each calibrated to release 7 drops per minute. The salt comes from:
 Antarctica: white salt from McMurdo Bay
 Africa: gray salt from Egypt
 Australia: brown salt from Western Australia
 Eurasia: ivory salt from Gwangju, South Korea
 North America: green salt from the Dominican Republic
 South America: pink salt from Chile
The work premiered at Larry Becker Contemporary Art, Philadelphia, 2005 and traveled to SolwayJones, Los Angeles later that year.

Books/catalogues solo

 Multiples & Objects, Dove Bradshaw, Limited Edition Box of 10; “Artist's Books”, 2010
 Images, text by David Frankel, Limited Edition Box of 10; “Artist's Books”, 2010
 Zero Time, Zero Space, Infinite Heat, Angles, Quick Constructions, Limited Edition Box of 10, “Artist's Books”, 2010
 Contingency, Limited Edition Box of 10, artist text; “Artist's Books”, 2009
 Copper & Stone, Limited Edition Box of 10, artist text; “Artist's Books”, 2009
 Salt, Limited Edition Box of 10, artist text; “Artist's Books”, 2009
 Plain Air, Limited Edition Box of 10, artist text,; “Artist's Books”, 2009
 Radio Rocks, Free Forum Natura, Baronessa Lucrezia Durini and Larry Becker Contemporary Art, Philadelphia, Limited Edition Box of 10; “Artist's Books”, 2008
 Time Matters, text by Charles Stuckey, Pierre Menard Gallery, Cambridge, Massachusetts, 2008
 Time & Material, text by Charles Stuckey, Senzatitolo Gallery, Rome, 2007
 Performance, texts by John Cage, Charles Stuckey, Battalion Commander Robert Schildhorn, Wilfredo Chiesa, Stuart Little, Carl Andre, Brian O’Doherty, Thomas McEvilley, James Putnam, Ray Johnson, Sol LeWitt, Ecke Bonk, Evelina Domnitch and Dmitry, David Ross, Marina Abramović, Nick Lawrence, Steve Berg, Antony Haden-Guest, Francis Nauman, Barry Schwabsky, William Anastasi, Robert Barry, Emanuel De Melo Pimenta, George Meyers, Jr., Dove Bradshaw, Timothy Bradshaw, Daniel Charles, Limited Edition of 10 “Artist's Books”, 2004
 ‘’The Art of Dove Bradshaw, Nature, Change and Indeterminacy’’, Thomas McEvilley; including republication of "John Cage and Thomas McEvilley: A Conversation, 1992", Mark Batty Publisher, West New York, NJ, 2003
 Anastasi Bradshaw Cage, Accompanying a three-person exhibition; "we are beginning to get nowhere” interview of William Anastasi and “Still Conversing with Cage” interview of Dove Bradshaw with Jacob Lillemose: Karl Aage Rasmussen, essay, The Museum of Contemporary Art, Roskilde, Denmark, 2001
 Dove Bradshaw / Jan Henle, Introduction by Julie Lazar, “Dove Bradshaw” by Mark Swed, afterword by Barbara Novak; “Jan Henle: Sculpture of No Thing” by Nancy Princenthal, The Museum of Contemporary Art, Los Angeles, 1998
 Dove Bradshaw: Inconsistency, Quotes by Tao Te Ching, Henry David Thoreau, John Cage, Franz Kafka selected by the artist, Sandra Gering Gallery, New York and Stalke Gallery, Copenhagen, 1998
 Dove Bradshaw; Indeterminacy, Anne Morgan, essay, Sandra Gering Gallery, New York and Stalke Kunsthandel, Copenhagen, 1997
 Dove Bradshaw, Contingency and Indeterminacy [Film], Selected quotes about the artist, Stalke Kunsthandel, Denmark, 1996
 Dove Bradshaw, “Living Metal” by Barry Schwabsky, Pier Gallery, Stromness, Orkney, Scotland, 1996
 Dove Bradshaw: Works 1969–1993, "John Cage and Thomas McEvilley: A Conversation", Sandra Gering Gallery, New York, 1993

References

Further reading

 Drawn / Taped / Burned: Abstraction on Paper, Katonah Museum of Art, Katonah, New York for Werner H. Kramarsky Drawing Collection, 2010
 The Third Mind, American Artists Contemplate Asia, 1860–1989, Solomon R. Guggenheim Museum, New York, January 30-April 19, 2009, Alexandra Munroe, Guggenheim Museum Publications, New York (2/0, 1971)
 560 Broadway, A New York Drawing Collection at Work, 1991–2006, Fifth Floor Foundation, New York & Yale University Press, New Haven, CT, 2008 pp. 48–49. 135, 140 (Contingency Jet, 2002)
 The Missing Peace, Artists & The Dalai Lama, Earth Aware Editions, San Rafael, CA, 2006 (salt, half heard in honor of the Dalai Lama, 2004)
 2006 Arts Sciences and Technology Foundation Observatory, Arte final / final art: ASA Art and Technology, of London, www.asa-art.com/asa.html. Portugal, 2006 (Constructions and Notations, 2006-7)
 The Invisible Thread: Buddhist Spirit in Contemporary Art, "If You Meet a Buddha, Kill The Buddha" by Dove Bradshaw, Snug Harbor Cultural Center, editors Jennifer Poole and Sarah Wyatt, 2004, p. 24, 25 (Negative Ions II, 1996)
 Conversing with Cage, 2nd edition, Richard Kostelanetz, Routledge, New York and London, 2003, pp. 200–202, 216–217
 Sitting Jefferson: Contemporary Artists Interpret Thomas Jefferson's Legacy, Jill Hartz, editor, University of Virginia Press, Charlottesville and London, 2003, p. 38 (Waterstone, 1996, Notation, 2000)
 Art and Artifact, The Museum As Medium, James Putnam, Thames & Hudson, London, 2001, pp. 159, 172 (Performance, 1976 and DO NOT TOUCH, 1979)
 The Century of Innocence, The History of the White Monochrome, Rooseum-Center for Contemporary Art, Malmo, Liljevalchs Konsthall, Stockholm, 2000, pp. 36,37 (Boundary, 1991)
 Ethereal and material, Douglas Maxwell, introduction, Dede Young, essay, Delaware Center for the Contemporary Arts, Delaware, 2000, p. 10 (Equivalents,1999)
 Sculpture In The Age Of Doubt, Thomas McEvilley, "John Cage and Thomas McEvilley: A Conversation", Allworth Press, New York, 1999, penultimate chapter (Plain Air, 1969)
 Installations MF Mattress Factory, 1990/1999, University of Pittsburgh Press, Pittsburgh, PA, 1999, pp. 26, 27, 148 (Plain Air, 1969)
 Merce Cunningham: Fifty Years, by David Vaughan, Aperture Foundation, New York, 1997, pp. 226, 227 228, 231, 232, 236, 243, 257 (Trackers, Cargo X, Carousal, Fabrications, Points In Space, Deli Commedia, Arcade, Native Green, Phrases, 1984–1991)
 From Time To Time, Guest-curators: Sarah Slavick and Kevin Rainey, Iris and B. Cantor Art Gallery, College of the Holy Cross, Worcester, MA, 1997, pp. 16, 17, 27, 31 (Contingency and Contingency [Book], 1992).
 Odyssey of a Collector: A Memoir by Charles Carpenter, Carnegie Museum of Art, Pittsburgh, PA, 1996, pp. 81, 136–139 (Contingency, 1995)
 New Art On Paper, Philadelphia Museum of Art, Hunt Manufacturing Collection, 1996, pp. 18–19, 84 (Carbon Removals, 1992)
 A Vital Matrix, Domestic Setting, Los Angeles, CA, 1995, pp. 1, 5 (Zn +S, 1993)
 Rolywholyover A Circus, John Cage, Museum of Contemporary Art, Los Angeles, and Rizzoli, New York, 1993 (Contingency paintings and works on paper, 1985–1991, Boundary, 1991, Carbon Removals, 1992)
 Blast 3; Remaking Civilization, The X-Art Foundation, New York, 1993 (including multiple Indeterminacy, Danger: Do Not Touch, Ingest Or Inhale, 1993)
 Blast: The Spatial Drive, The X Art Foundation, New York, 1992 (multiple ‘’Ag + K2S203’’, 1993)
 Gulliver's Travels, Galerie Sophia Ungers, DuMont Buchverlag, Koln, Germany, 1992, p. 36 (Medium, 1992)
 Carnegie International, Carnegie Museum, Rizzoli, Carnegie Museum, 1991, p. 62 (Contingency I–XI, 1985–199I)
 Anastasi Bradshaw Cage Marioni Rauschenberg Tobey, "...imitating nature in her manner of operation..., John Cage interviewed by Richard Kostelanetz, Sandra Gering Gallery, New York, 1990, pp. 3–4, 6, 11 (Contingency, 1989, Carbon Removals, 1981)
 Lines of Vision, Drawings by Contemporary Women, Dr. Judy K. Collishan Van Wagner, Hudson Hills Press, New York, 1989, p. 27 (Collage on wood, 1986)
 Strange Attractors; The Spectacle of Chaos, The New Museum Exhibition catalogue, Chicago, 1989 (Without Title, 1989, Spotted Cow: Vellum),
 Art Against Aids, by Stephem Reichard and Anne Livet, the American Foundation for Aids Research, New York, 1987, p. 147 (Without Title [head], oil on vellum, 1986)
 Contacts Communicating Interpersonally, “She knows the Value of a Smile”, Teri Kwal and Michael Gamble, Random House, New York, 1983, p. 116 (30% [sic] Better, 1979, 50% Better)
 Arteder Flash 82, (Feria Internacionale de Muestra de Bilbao, Bilbao Muestra Internacional de Obra Graphica, Bilboa, 1982, p. 885 (30% [sic] Better, 1979 now titled 50% Better)
 X, Writings ’79–’82, James Joyce, Marcel Duchamp, Erik Satie: An Alphabet, John Cage, Wesleyan University Press, Middletown, Connecticut, pp. 84–85 (Bradshaw, a "letter" in Cage's Alphabet)
 For The Birds, Sixth Interview, “I feel very close to conceptual art...” by John Cage in conversation with Daniel Charles, Marion Boyars Boston: London, 1982, p. 157 (text)
 Are You Experienced?, Bleus, Vrije Universitiet, G.B./ Administration Center, Kiekplein, Brussels, Belgium, 1981, p. 14 (Performance, 1976)
 Windows at Tiffany's The Art of Gene Moore, Judith Goldman with commentary by Gene Moore, Harry N. Abrams Inc., New York, 1980, p. 124 (Without Titles [dragon fly and Butterfly glass sculptures], 1974–75)
The Harvard Advocate, First Issue, Harvard University Press, Cambridge, Massachusetts, Dove Bradshaw's illustration of Plain Air, 1969 accompanying review of the publication of Dialogues with Marcel Duchamp by Pierre Cabanne, 1972), Summer, 1972, p. 88

1949 births
Living people
Artists from New York City
Boston University alumni
Tufts University alumni
20th-century American artists
20th-century American women artists
21st-century American artists
21st-century American women artists